Music Mouse is an algorithmic musical composition software developed by Laurie Spiegel.

Spiegel's best known and most widely used software, "Music Mouse - An Intelligent Instrument" (1986) is for Macintosh, Amiga and Atari computers.  The "intelligent instrument" name refers to the program's built-in knowledge of chord and scale convention and stylistic constraints.  Automating these processes allows the user to focus on other aspects of the music in real time.  In addition to improvisations using this software, Spiegel composed several works for "Music Mouse", including Cavis muris in 1986, Three Sonic Spaces in 1989, and Sound Zones in 1990.  She continued to update the program through Macintosh OS 9 and, as of 2021, it remained available for purchase or demo download from her website.

See also
 List of music software

Sources

External links
"Music Mouse", The Music Mouse website.
"Music Mouse Instruction Manual", The Music Mouse Instruction Manual and Tutorial by Laurie Spiegel.
"Music Mouse - An Intelligent Instrument - An Emulation" Tero Parviainen, Independent Software Developer

Music software